The Piarist Church, also known as the Church of Maria Treu, is a Baroque parish church of the Order of the Piarists (Patres Scholarum Piarum) in Vienna, Austria. It is located in Vienna's 8th district (Josefstadt). The Piaristenkirche was elevated to the rank of Basilica Minor in 1949.

The right tower has an approximate height of 42.8m as measured and calculated by the 5C class of the Piaristengymnasium in the school year of 2021/2022.

Interior 
The church has eight chapels and is decorated with frescoes made by Franz Anton Maulbertsch in 1752–53.

Trivia 
Commissioned by the Piarists, Haydn's Missa in Tempore Belli (Mass in Time of War, sometimes known as the Paukenmesse or Kettledrum Mass) was first performed on 26 December 1796.

Notes

External links 

 High resolution Gb picture of the interior of the Church

Basilica churches in Austria
Roman Catholic church buildings in the Vicariate of Vienna City
Piarist Order
Buildings and structures in Josefstadt